Marie-Christine Duroy (born 27 March 1957) is a French equestrian. She competed at the 1984, 1988, 1992 and the 1996 Summer Olympics.

References

External links
 

1957 births
Living people
French female equestrians
Olympic equestrians of France
Equestrians at the 1984 Summer Olympics
Equestrians at the 1988 Summer Olympics
Equestrians at the 1992 Summer Olympics
Equestrians at the 1996 Summer Olympics
Sportspeople from Besançon